The 1955–60 Central European International Cup was the final edition of the Central European International Cup. It was replaced by the European Nations Championship. Yugoslavia took part for the first time.

Final standings

Matches

Winner

Statistics

Goalscorers

See also
Balkan CupBaltic CupNordic CupMediterranean Cup

References

External links

Central European International Cup